Stupart may refer to:

Stupart Island, an island of Nunavut, Canada
Stupart, Ontario, a community in Sudbury District, Ontario, Canada

People with the surname
Doug Stupart (1882–1951), South African triple jumper and hurdler
Robert Frederic Stupart (1857–1940), Canadian meteorologist